GC-rich sequence DNA-binding factor homolog is a protein that in humans is encoded by the PAXBP1 gene.

Similarity to a transcriptional repressor suggests that this gene's protein product is involved in the regulation of transcription. Alternative splicing of this gene results in three transcript variants encoding different isoforms. Additional transcript variants have been described, but their full-length sequences have not been determined.

References

External links

Further reading